Gloucester Point is a census-designated place (CDP) in Gloucester County, Virginia, United States. The population was 9,402 at the 2010 census. It is home to the College of William & Mary's Virginia Institute of Marine Science, a graduate school for the study of oceanography.

Geography 
Gloucester Point is located in southern Gloucester County at  (37.269907, −76.498604), on the north side of the York River in southeastern Virginia. To the south across the river on U.S. Route 17 and the George P. Coleman Memorial Bridge is Yorktown, site of the conclusion of the American Revolutionary War. From Gloucester Point, US 17 leads south through Yorktown  to the center of Newport News and north  to Gloucester Courthouse, the Gloucester County seat.

Demographics 
As of the census of 2000, there were 9,429 people, 3,787 households, and 2,715 families residing in the CDP. The population density was 1,125.2 people per square mile (434.4/km2). There were 4,071 housing units at an average density of 485.8/sq mi (187.6/km2). The racial makeup of the CDP was 87.18% White, 9.16% African American, 0.47% Native American, 1.27% Asian, 0.06% Pacific Islander, 0.60% from other races, and 1.25% from two or more races. Hispanic or Latino of any race were 1.73% of the population.

There were 3,787 households, out of which 32.5% had children under the age of 18 living with them, 56.7% were married couples living together, 10.9% had a female householder with no husband present, and 28.3% were non-families. 22.3% of all households were made up of individuals, and 8.2% had someone living alone who was 65 years of age or older. The average household size was 2.49 and the average family size was 2.90.

In the CDP, the population was spread out, with 24.4% under the age of 18, 7.8% from 18 to 24, 30.9% from 25 to 44, 25.1% from 45 to 64, and 11.8% who were 65 years of age or older. The median age was 38 years. For every 100 females, there were 96.3 males. For every 100 females age 18 and over, there were 93.2 males.

The median income for a household in the CDP was $45,536, and the median income for a family was $52,888. Males had a median income of $35,855 versus $26,306 for females. The per capita income for the CDP was $20,536. About 8.6% of families and 8.9% of the population were below the poverty line, including 11.5% of those under age 18 and 9.2% of those age 65 or over.

References 

Census-designated places in Gloucester County, Virginia
Census-designated places in Virginia